Deyan Borisov (born 1 March 1989) is a Bulgarian footballer currently playing as a midfielder for Sportist Svoge.

References

External links
 

Bulgarian footballers
1989 births
Living people
FC Sportist Svoge players
FC Oborishte players
FC Botev Vratsa players
First Professional Football League (Bulgaria) players
Association football midfielders